Kantha Gunatilleke was the 4th Chief Minister of Sabaragamuwa. He was appointed in April 1999 succeeding Jayatilake Podinilame and was Chief Minister until June 1999. He was succeeded by Athauda Seneviratne.

References

Members of the Sabaragamuwa Provincial Council
Chief Ministers of Sabaragamuwa Province